Fukuoka station may refer to:

Stations in Fukuoka City, Kyushu
Hakata Station, a major transport hub served by JR and Fukuoka City Subway
Nishitetsu-Fukuoka (Tenjin) Station, station of Nishi-Nippon Railroad on its Tenjin Ōmuta Line

Other
Fukuoka Station, station of Ainokaze Toyama Railway in Toyama prefecture
Ninohe Station, called Fukuoka station prior to 1921 and Kita-Fukuoka station prior to 1987
Ina-Fukuoka Station, station of JR Central in Nagano Prefecture
Mino-Fukuoka Station (abolished), Gifu Prefecture
Kaga-Fukuoka Station (abolished), Ishikawa Prefecture

See also
Kami-Fukuoka Station
Minami-Fukuoka Station